Nikolai Ilyich Bulatov (born 21 January 1857) was an Imperial Russian corps commander. He took part in the wars against the Ottoman Empire and the Empire of Japan.

Awards
Order of Saint Stanislaus (House of Romanov), 3rd class, 1878
Order of Saint Anna, 3rd class, 1883
Order of Saint Stanislaus (House of Romanov), 2nd class, 1901
Order of Saint Anna, 2nd class, 1906
Order of Saint Vladimir, 3rd class, 1907
Order of Saint Stanislaus (House of Romanov), 1st class, 1911
Order of Saint Vladimir, 2nd class, 1916
Order of Saint George, 4th degree (October 30, 1916)

Russian military personnel of the Russo-Turkish War (1877–1878)
Russian military personnel of the Russo-Japanese War
Russian military personnel of World War I
Recipients of the Order of Saint Stanislaus (Russian), 3rd class
Recipients of the Order of St. Anna, 3rd class
Recipients of the Order of Saint Stanislaus (Russian), 2nd class
Recipients of the Order of St. Anna, 2nd class
Recipients of the Order of St. Vladimir, 3rd class
Recipients of the Order of Saint Stanislaus (Russian), 1st class
Recipients of the Order of St. Vladimir, 2nd class
1857 births
Year of death missing